John Tanner may refer to:
John S. Tanner (born 1944), former U.S. congressman from Tennessee
John Sigismund Tanner (1705–1775), engraver to the Royal Mint, born in Coburg
John Riley Tanner (1844–1901), former governor of Illinois
John Tanner (American football, born 1897) (1897–1976), player in the National Football League, 1922–1924
John Tanner (gridiron football, born 1945) (1945–2009), played in the National Football League and the Canadian Football League
John Tanner (cyclist) (born 1968), British champion racing cyclist
John Tanner (Mormon) (1778–1850), chief financial backer of the Kirtland Temple
John Sears Tanner (born 1950), president of Brigham Young University–Hawaii
John Tanner (criminal), convicted of the 1991 murder of Rachel McLean
John Tanner (captive) (1780–1846), child kidnapped by Indians, author of book about it
John Tanner (cricketer) (1772–1858), English amateur cricketer
John Tanner (footballer) (1921–1987), English footballer
John Tanner (ice hockey) (born 1971), retired ice hockey player
John Tanner (bishop) (died 1615), Anglican bishop
John Tanner (rugby union) (1927–2020), New Zealand rugby union player
John Tanner (MP), MP for Malmesbury
John Tanner, a character in Bernard Shaw's play Man and Superman
John Tanner, the main character of the Driver video game franchise

See also
Jack Tanner (disambiguation)
John Tanner State Park, Georgia, united States
John Tanner House, Petersburg, Kentucky, United States